The Stony River is a river in the South Island of New Zealand. 
Rising at southern end of the Grampian Mountains, it runs west for  through rough country to the Mackenzie Basin before emptying into Lake Benmore.

Rivers of Canterbury, New Zealand
Rivers of New Zealand